Ravi Kapoor (born 7 April 1942), commonly and widely known by his mononymously screen name Jeetendra, is an Indian actor who is known for his work in Hindi cinema. He also serves as the chairman of the Balaji Telefilms and Balaji Motion Pictures.

Early life 
Jeetendra was born in a Punjabi Khatri family as Ravi Kapoor in Amritsar, Punjab, to Amarnath and Krishna Kapoor, whose business dealt with imitation jewellery, supplied to film industry. He attended St. Sebastian's Goan High School in Girgaum, Mumbai with his friend Rajesh Khanna and then studied at Siddharth College in Mumbai. While supplying jewellery to V. Shantaram, he was cast as Sandhya's character's double in the 1959 movie Navrang after which his career never turned back.

Career 
Jeetendra's active acting career spanned the 1960s to the 1990s. Jeetendra got his first major breaks with V. Shantaram's Geet Gaya Patharon Ne (1964) and Boond Jo Ban Gayee Moti (1967). However, it was the film Farz (1967) that served as his stepping stone to success. The tee shirt and white shoes he picked up from a retail store for the Mast Baharon Ka Main Aashiq number in Farz, became his trademark. Farz was followed by films such as Caravan and Humjoli, in which Jeetendra had more dance numbers. His vigorous dancing in the films won him the epithet; "Jumping Jack of Bollywood".

He has acted in nearly 200 films as the main lead, a feat matched by just a handful of his peers since the inception of Hindi cinema. Jeetendra was frequently paired with Jaya Prada or Sridevi for remakes of Telugu films by T. Rama Rao, K. Bapayya, K. Raghavendra Rao and Dasari Narayana Rao; these included Sanjog, Aulad, Majaal, Justice Chaudhury, Mawaali (1983), Himmatwala (1983) and Tohfa (1984). He also acted in many remakes in Hindi of Krishna's Telugu movies and had very close association with him. Besides these south Indian remakes, there was a subdued side of Jeetendra whenever he'd worked with the writer/lyricist Gulzar in films such as Parichay, Kinara and Khushboo that had several beautifully penned songs such as "O Majhi Re", "Musafir Hoon Yaaron" and "Naam Gum Jaayega", composed by Rahul Dev Burman and sung by Kishore Kumar.

Personal life 

Jeetendra had met his wife, Shobha, when she was only 14. She completed school, went to college, and was employed as an Air Hostess with British Airways. When Jeetendra was struggling between 1960–66 to establish himself as an actor, he was in a relationship with Shobha and she was his girlfriend until 1972. It was not until the release of Bidaai on 18 October 1974, that Jeetendra and Shobha decided to get married, which they did in a simple ceremony at Janki Kutir with only a few family members and friends present. In her authorized biography, Hema Malini claimed that they almost got married, but she backed out.

Jeetendra and Shobha have two children from their marriage. Elder of them, daughter Ekta Kapoor, runs Balaji Telefilms while their son Tusshar Kapoor is also an actor. Jeetendra made a brief appearance in one of his daughter's produced films Kucch To Hai, a thriller movie released in 2003, where he appeared alongside his son Tusshar.

During the 6th November, 2021 episode of The Kapil Sharma Show, when Jeetendra and Ekta Kapoor were the guests, he related an incident from 1976. He was supposed to go to Madras (now Chennai) by flight on Karva Chauth. His flight got delayed and he went back home so that Shobha could perform the necessary rituals like viewing the moon and break her fast. Shobha refused to let him go back to the airport. So Jeetendra called his make-up man and told him to come back home, and that they would leave the next day. Around 10:30 or 11:00 PM, he looked outside from his flat (on a high-rise in Pali Hill, Bandra) and saw a fireball hurtling toward the airport. Later, after a couple of hours, his phone rang incessantly with people calling to find out what happened. The flight that he was supposed to have taken had crashed. Shobha's prescient insistence that he should not go turned out to be a blessing. That flight was Indian Airlines Flight 171.

Filmography

Awards and honours
 1998 – Guest of Honour Award at the 18th Ujala Cinema Express Awards
 2002 – Lifetime Achievement Award at the Zee Gold Bollywood Movie Awards in New York.
 2003 – Filmfare Lifetime Achievement Award
 2004 – "Legend of Indian Cinema" Award at Atlantic City (United States).
 2005 – Screen Lifetime Achievement Award
 2008 – Sansui Television Lifetime Achievement Award
 2012 – Zee Cine Award for Lifetime Achievement
 2012 – Lions Gold Awards: Most Evergreen Romantic Hero

References

External links 

 

Indian male film actors
1942 births
Living people
Filmfare Lifetime Achievement Award winners
Film producers from Punjab, India
Male actors in Hindi cinema
Male actors from Amritsar
Punjabi film producers
Punjabi people
20th-century Indian male actors
21st-century Indian male actors
Actors from Mumbai